El Sid may refer to:  

 "El Sid" (Sliders), a second season episode of the TV series Sliders
 Sid Fernandez (born 1962), an American Major League Baseball left-handed pitcher
 Sidney Moncrief (born 1957), an American retired professional basketball player
 Sidney Green (basketball) (born 1961), an American basketball player and coach

See also
 El Cid (disambiguation)